The discography of American rapper Rich the Kid consists of three studio albums, 7 mixtapes, 14 collaborative mixtapes, 1 extended play and 39 singles (including 14 as a featured artist).

Studio albums

EPs

Mixtapes

Collaborative mixtapes

Singles

As lead artist

As featured artist

Other charted songs

Guest appearances

Notes

References 

Discographies of American artists
Hip hop discographies